Henley-in-Arden School is a mixed secondary school located in Henley-in-Arden in the English county of Warwickshire.

Previously a community school administered by Warwickshire County Council, Henley-in-Arden School converted to academy status in August 2011. On 1 April 2019, the school joined the Arden Multi-Academy Trust (AMAT) family of schools. However, the school continues to coordinate with Warwickshire County Council for admissions. The school offers mostly GCSEs as programmes of study for pupils and is a specialist Performing Arts school with a number of high-profile alumni. Students are able to study all three of Acting, Dance and Music for their KS4 programme of study at Henley.

References

External links
Henley-in-Arden School official website

Secondary schools in Warwickshire
Academies in Warwickshire
Henley-in-Arden
Specialist arts colleges in England